Relaciones peligrosas (English: Dangerous Affairs), originally known as Física o Química (Physics or Chemistry), is an American Spanish-language telenovela produced by Telemundo Studios, Miami. It is an adaptation of the Spanish television series Física o Química.

Starring Sandra Echeverría, Gabriel Coronel, Maritza Bustamante, Jonathan Freudman, Carlos Ferro, Daniela Navarro, Renato Rossini, Gonzalo García Vivanco and Ana Layevska in the leading roles of the plot.

History 
From January 24 to June 25, 2012, Telemundo aired Relaciones Peligrosas weeknights at 10pm/9c during the 2012 season, replacing La Casa de al Lado. As with most of its other telenovelas, the network broadcast English subtitles as closed captions on CC3.

Story 
Set in modern times, Dangerous Affairs delves into the difficult and often conflict-filled relationships between teenagers, their parents and teachers at a bilingual high school (Cervantes Academy School of Arts). Everything begins with the story of Miranda Cruz (Sandra Echeverría), a beautiful young woman who begins an affair with Mauricio, her student, while a teacher in this institution. In her world, the hidden truths that many adults try to avoid are revealed: love relationships that are prohibited, discriminated or judged that can turn into a real-world nightmare.

Cast

Main
 Sandra Echeverría as Miranda Beatriz Cruz
 Ana Layevska as Patricia "Patty" Milano
 Gonzalo García Vivanco as Juan Pablo Reyes / JP / Daniel Arámbula / Gael Sánchez
 Maritza Bustamante as Ana Conde
 Gabriel Coronel as Mauricio Blanco
 Daniela Navarro as Olivia Kloster

Recurring
Mercedes Molto - Benita Mendoza
Sandra Destenave - Carmen de Blanco
Carlos Ferro - Santiago Madrazo
Jesús Licciardelo - Oliver Torres
Jorge Consejo - Gilberto Verdugo
Ana Carolina Grajales - Sofía Blanco
Danilo Carrera - Leonardo Máximo
Orlando Fundichely - Orlando Aragón
Dad Dager - Clementina de Máximo
Andy Pérez - Cassius Dupont
Óscar Priego - Gonzalo Mendoza
Jeanette Lehr - Teresa Vargas
Héctor Fuentes - Armando Madrazo
Christian de la Campa -  Joaquin Rivera
Rubén Morales - Ricardo Gómez
Yadira Santana - Guadalupe "Lupe" Guzmán
Renato Rossini - Manuel Blanco †
Jimmy Bernal - Andrés Máximo
Carmen Olivares - Soledad Cruz †
Modesto Lacen - Bertrand Dupont
Jezabel Montero - Mrs. Aragón
RJ Coleman  - Robert "Bob / Gringo" McDowell
Kevin Aponte - Alejandro "Ale" Portillo
Jonathan Freudman - Diego Barón
Alex Hernandez - Sebastián Aragón
Yrahid Leylanni - Yesenia Rivera
Ana Lorena Sánchez - Elizabeth Gómez
Cristina Mason - Nora Guzmán
Alma Matrecito - Violeta Verdugo
Alan Rodriguez - Rodrigo Aragón
Nicole Apolonio - Emily

Awards and nominations 
Though Relaciones Peligrosas was nominated for Favorite Lead Actor, The Best Bad Boy, Best Supporting Actor and Actress, The Perfect Couple, and The Best Kiss,; it did not win any awards.

References

External links 
Relaciones Peligrosas Official Web Site
Relaciones Peligrosas Official Mobile Site
Telemundo Novelas App featuring 'Relaciones Peligrosas' for iPhone and iPad
Telemundo Novelas App featuring 'Relaciones Peligrosas' for Android

American television series based on telenovelas
Telemundo telenovelas
2012 telenovelas
2012 American television series debuts
2012 American television series endings
Spanish-language American telenovelas
Television shows set in Miami
American television series based on Spanish television series